Gevorg Najaryan (born 6 January 1998) is a Kazakh footballer of Armenian descent who plays as a central midfielder for Van.

Club career

Shakhter Karagandy
On 11 March 2015, Najaryan made his senior team debut in Kazakhstan Premier League against FC Ordabasy at Metallurg Stadium, replacing Vladislav Vasiliev at the 83rd minute by coach Vladimir Cheburin. On 5 April 2015, Najaryan scored his first senior team goal against FC Tobol at 59th minute. The goal was the first goal in the match but Shakhter Karagandy was defeat by 4-1. Najaryan played eight games and scored a goal for Shakhter Karagandy.

Astana
In January 2016, Najaryan moved to defending Kazakhstan Premier League champions FC Astana.

On 6 July 2017, Najaryan returned to Shakhter Karagandy on loan for the remainder of the 2017 season.

Pyunik
On 16 February 2022, Pyunik announced the signing of Najaryan.

Van
On 8 September 2022, Van announced the signing of Najaryan from Pyunik.

International
In May 2018, Najaryan was called up to represent Kazakhstan.

Career statistics

Honours

Club

Pyunik
 Armenian Premier League: 2021–22

Astana
Kazakhstan Premier League (1): 2016
Kazakhstan Cup (1): 2016

References

External links
 

Living people
1998 births
Kazakhstani footballers
Kazakhstan youth international footballers
Kazakhstan under-21 international footballers
Kazakhstan international footballers
Association football midfielders
FC Astana players
FC Shakhter Karagandy players
Kazakhstan Premier League players
Kazakhstani people of Armenian descent
Footballers from Yerevan
Armenian footballers